Oxford Academy, sometimes stylized as OA, is a public school in Cypress, California serving grades 7–12 as part of the Anaheim Union High School District.

As of 2022, the school was ranked #3 for the best high schools in California by U.S. News & World Report, as well as #19 for the best U.S. high schools.

History 

Built in 1960 on the corner of Orange Ave and Grindlay St in Cypress, Oxford Academy's campus originally served as the location of the Anaheim Union High School District's new middle school. Oxford Junior High School was established in 1965, but closed soon after in 1980 due to declining enrollment. Afterwards, the campus hosted various different institutions for brief periods of time, including a satellite campus for Barclay College as well as the Cypress Cultural Arts Center. Finally, in response to district-wide school overcrowding, administrators reopened the site as Oxford Academy, a magnet school serving AUHSD students, in the fall of 1998.

Although some administrators and teachers expressed concern that the new school would poach the best students from schools around the district, they decided ultimately that the competition would be beneficial, not only for those high-achieving students at Oxford but also for other schools aiming to keep pace.

Admissions 
Admission to Oxford Academy is done primarily for the incoming seventh grade class. Each year, about 200 spaces are reserved for students who reside within AUHSD boundaries, which serves most of Anaheim and Cypress, but also portions of La Palma, Buena Park, and Stanton. The school also designates an additional 35 spots for those who may live outside the district borders. In addition to this, there is also admission allowed for incoming eighth and ninth grade students, though only to fill in spaces for students in those classes who have left the school. When spaces are limited, the school may bar admission for such students. Furthermore, to provide opportunities for students who live in all areas of the district, the school takes in an equal number of students from each of its regions (represented by the eight AUHSD junior high school districts).

The admission process is two-fold. First, during the fall, applicants must submit their final report cards for the prior two years, as well as some proof of residence and a reference from a teacher. Then, applicants who pass this initial filter are invited to take an entrance exam the following January. This exam consists of multiple choice reading comprehension and mathematics questions, short answer math questions, and a written essay. Students are then informed of their admission (or failure thereof) the following month. 

The school's prestigious reputation has also given rise to classes offered by private tutoring organizations in the area, such as Perfect Score Academy and Pace Academy, to assist prospective students in preparing for the entrance examination.

Demographics 
In the 2020-21 school year, Oxford Academy's enrollment totaled 1283 junior high school and high school students. Of this, boys numbered 643 (50.1%), slightly outnumbering girls, who tallied at 640 (49.9%). 

Oxford's student body is mostly Asian-Americans. According to the NCES, its racial makeup during the aforementioned school year was  

 928 (72.3%) Asian
 231 (18.0%) Hispanic
 85 (6.6%) White (non-hispanic)
 22 (1.7%) Two or more races
 11 (0.9%) Black (non-hispanic)
 3 (0.2%) American Indian / Alaska Native

As reported by the State of California, 42.9% of the student body was eligible for either free or reduced-price lunch under the National School Lunch Act of 1946.

Dress code 

Oxford Academy mandates a dress code for its students while on campus or at school-sponsored events. Students must wear a solid red, white, blue, or grey polo top paired with khaki or navy-blue pants, shorts, or skirt. Black tops were once allowed, but were prohibited prior to the 2010-11 school year. Denim pants (including jeans) are not permitted. Students may also wear a sweatshirt or sweater of an appropriate color, though only on top of the aforementioned polo. If a jacket or coat is worn, it is permitted to be solid black. Socks are allowed to be some combination of these colors (or black), and shoes may also be solid brown. To fulfill these criteria, students generally wear a school-provided top, which is a solid-color polo with the Oxford Academy "OA" logo embroidered on the chest, as well as school-provided khaki bottoms.

There are many instances in which the school allows deviation from the standardized dress. Generally, students may wear formal attire to school if required to for a class or club-related event. On Fridays, students may wear class-specific or club t-shirts, though these must also be some combination of the approved school colors, and on the first Friday of each month they may even wear jeans, provided they also wear a college shirt. Spirit days, such as Halloween, enable an even greater break from dress code, though on these days students must still dress within the specified theme. Finally, the school holds "free dress days", typically on the last day of the semester, where students are allowed to wear anything which fits within the wider AUHSD dress code.

Violation of dress code during normal school hours results in the student being forced to change clothes in addition to an assigned consequence according to the school's progressive discipline policy (typically detention). Too many of such infractions may even cause the offender to lose the privilege of participating in the free dress days.

Academics 
Oxford Academy aims to best prepare its students for college in a number of ways. For one, it runs on a "block schedule", holding even periods on Tuesdays and Thursdays and odd periods on Wednesdays and Fridays, mirroring the longer but more spaced out class structure found at most American universities. The school also provides a large selection of advanced placement (AP) courses for potential future college credit, even some which are mandatory (including, but not limited to, AP English Language and AP US History). Oxford offers classes which fit the University of California "A-G Course" requirements, guaranteeing that students graduate having fulfilled the minimum course requirements for attending a school in the UC system. Students may even dual enroll at nearby Cypress College to take courses which directly transfer to CSU or UC system schools. 

Oxford Academy upholds a strict GPA requirement for its students. 7th and 8th graders must maintain a 2.5, 9th and 10th graders a 2.7, and 11th and 12th graders a 3.0 grade point average in order to avoid being placed on academic probation. Failure to improve one's academic performance to this standard results in expulsion from the school. 

Aside from its standard classes, Oxford also offers four different pathways - Biotechnology, Business, Computer Science, and Engineering - in an effort to expose students to different fields of study they may pursue after high school. In junior high, students take a pathway introductory course lasting one quarter each. Afterwards, in high school, students select a pathway and take three corresponding courses at their own pace. Students are also required to take at least four years of foreign language and two years of some visual and performing arts (also called VAPA). The foreign language offerings have changed over the years, with French and Mandarin being taught in the past. As of 2018, the two languages offered are Spanish and Korean. To fulfill their mandatory VAPA requirement, students may choose between orchestra, band, choir, and art.

Athletics 
Oxford offers a variety of extracurricular sports for its students to participate in. High school students may join cross country, volleyball, baseball / softball, basketball, soccer, tennis, swimming, or track and field, and typically compete against other schools in the 605 League within the CIF Southern Section. Oxford used to offer other sports, such as golf, and notably does not have its own football team. Junior high school students may partake in intramural athletics, which include all the aforementioned sports as well as flag-football. They also play against other middle schools in AUHSD.

References

External links 
Oxford Academy Website

Education in Orange County, California
High schools in Orange County, California
Cypress, California
Public high schools in California
Public middle schools in California
Schools accredited by the Western Association of Schools and Colleges
1998 establishments in California
Educational institutions established in 1998